David Terence McKenna (24 January 1957 – 19 March 2014) was a Canadian optometrist, businessman and politician. He represented the electoral district of Glen Stewart-Bellevue Cove in the Legislative Assembly of Prince Edward Island from 2003 to 2007. He was a Progressive Conservative.

A resident of Stratford, Prince Edward Island, McKenna attended the University of Prince Edward Island, and graduated from the optometry program at the University of Waterloo. He owned and operated Family Vision Centre in Charlottetown for 32 years. He entered provincial politics in the 2003 election, winning the Glen Stewart-Bellevue Cove riding. In the 2007 election, he lost to Liberal Cynthia Dunsford by 81 votes in the renamed Stratford-Kinlock riding.

On March 19, 2014, McKenna died in Queenstown, New Zealand, at the age of 57.

References

2014 deaths
Businesspeople from Prince Edward Island
Progressive Conservative Party of Prince Edward Island MLAs
University of Prince Edward Island alumni
University of Waterloo alumni
21st-century Canadian politicians
1957 births